Wall of Sound is a British independent record label based in London, England, and was founded by Mark Jones in 1994. They were considered to be "at the center of the revolution" of the Big Beat movement in the mid to late 90s, releasing much of the UK's Big Beat material at the height of the scene alongside Brighton's Skint Records. The label is most known for introducing internationally renowned Big Beat acts such as Propellerheads, The Wiseguys and Les Rythmes Digitales.

History
The label's first release was acclaimed compilation album Give 'Em Enough Dope Volume One, which featured many acts such as Mekon, Kruder & Dorfmeister, and The Wiseguys before they became more notable. The compilation is also considered to be foundational to the Big Beat movement of the mid to late 90s.

The label gained international recognition and residencies were set up in cities around the globe including a yearly summer residency at Ibiza's "Manumission" (an annual club party).

Human League released their first album Credo for Wall of Sound in 2011. In September they released the album on vinyl.

Notable artists
 Aeroplane
 Grace Jones
 The Human League
 Reverend and The Makers
 Röyksopp
 Scala & Kolacny Brothers

Notable past projects

 Agent Provocateur
 Akasha
 The American Analog Set
 Amp Fiddler
 Artery Jon Carter
 The Bees
 Blak Twang
 Ceasefire
 Cosmo Jarvis
 The Creators
 Diefenbach
 DJ Pierre
 Dylan Donkin
 Elektrons
 Etienne De Crecy
 Eugene
 Felix Da Housecat
 Iain Archer
 I Am Kloot
 Infadels
 DJ Touche
 Jon Carter
 Junior Cartier
 Kids On Bridges
 Lisbon Kid
 Little Barrie
 Les Rythmes Digitales (aka Stuart Price)
 Medicine
 Mekon
 Michael Andrews
 Mongrel
 Mogwai
 Mpho Skeef
 Ocelot
 Penguin Prison
 Propellerheads
 Reverend and The Makers
 Rootless
 Shawn Lee
 Shy Child
 Tepr
 The Shortwave Set
 Themroc
 Ugly Duckling
 The Wiseguys
 Tiga
 The Visitor Jon Pleased Wimmin
 Zoot Woman

See also
 Give 'Em Enough Dope Volume One (1994)
 List of record labels
 List of independent UK record labels

References

External links
 BBC Collective's review of the label
 Wall Of Sound page on Discogs

Electronic music record labels
British independent record labels
Ambient music record labels
Indie rock record labels
Hip hop record labels